Flint Creek is an unincorporated area and census-designated place (CDP) in Delaware County, Oklahoma, United States. The population was 732 at the 2010 census, up from 580 in 2000.

Geography
Flint Creek is located along the southern border of Delaware County at  (36.173587, -94.747034), with Adair County to the south. The Illinois River and Flint Creek form the southeastern boundary of the CDP, U.S. Route 59 forms the northeastern edge, Five Mile Hollow Road forms part of the northern edge, and Oklahoma State Highway 10 forms the western extent of the CDP.

Demographics

As of the census of 2000, there were 580 people, 217 households, and 182 families residing in the CDP. The population density was 91.7 people per square mile (35.4/km2). There were 326 housing units at an average density of 51.5/sq mi (19.9/km2). The racial makeup of the CDP was 84.14% White, 0.17% African American, 11.72% Native American, and 3.97% from two or more races. Hispanic or Latino of any race were 0.86% of the population.

There were 217 households, out of which 30.9% had children under the age of 18 living with them, 72.4% were married couples living together, 6.9% had a female householder with no husband present, and 16.1% were non-families. 12.9% of all households were made up of individuals, and 2.3% had someone living alone who was 65 years of age or older. The average household size was 2.67 and the average family size was 2.88.

In the CDP, the population was spread out, with 25.7% under the age of 18, 7.1% from 18 to 24, 28.4% from 25 to 44, 25.5% from 45 to 64, and 13.3% who were 65 years of age or older. The median age was 37 years. For every 100 females, there were 110.1 males. For every 100 females age 18 and over, there were 111.3 males.

The median income for a household in the CDP was $30,781, and the median income for a family was $33,438. Males had a median income of $23,750 versus $17,917 for females. The per capita income for the CDP was $15,457. About 12.1% of families and 11.7% of the population were below the poverty line, including 13.3% of those under age 18 and 18.7% of those age 65 or over.

References

Census-designated places in Delaware County, Oklahoma
Census-designated places in Oklahoma